Alberto Rodolfo Chividini (23 February 1907 – 31 October 1961) was an Argentine football defender. He made appearances in three games of the Argentina national team between 1928 and 1930: one in the 1930 FIFA World Cup and two in the 1929 South American Championship (where he was champion).

Honours
Argentina
1929 South American Championship

References

External links

1907 births
1961 deaths
Argentine footballers
Argentine people of Italian descent
Argentina international footballers
1930 FIFA World Cup players
Club Atlético Vélez Sarsfield footballers
San Lorenzo de Almagro footballers
Association football defenders
Footballers from Buenos Aires
Club Atlético Colón managers